I'm Not an Angel or I'm Not An Angel may refer to:

 "I'm Not an Angel", a song by Halestorm on their album Halestorm
 "I'm Not An Angel", a song by Kimmie Rhodes
 "I'm Not an Angel", a song by Ra
 Nisam Anđeo, (I'm Not an Angel), album by Marija Šerifović.
 Tenshi Nanka Ja Nai, (I'm Not an Angel), manga by Ai Yazawa
 "Cheonsaga Anya", (천사가 아냐, "I'm Not an Angel"), a song by APink on their EP Pink Luv

See also
 I'm No Angel (disambiguation)
 No Angel (disambiguation)
 Not an Angel